The 2020–21 Women's Volleyball Thailand League is the 16th season of the Women's Volleyball Thailand League, the top Thai professional league for women's volleyball clubs, since its establishment in 2005, also known as Daikin Women's Volleyball Thailand League due to the sponsorship deal with Daikin. A total of 8 teams will compete in the league. The season will begin on 12 November 2020  and is scheduled to conclude in 2021. This season will be organized by the Thailand Volleyball Association (TVA) instead Thailand Volleyball Co.,Ltd. The season started.

Teams
Eight teams compete in the league – the top six teams from the previous season and the two teams promoted from the Pro Challenge. The promoted teams are Samut Prakan VC and Rangsit University. Rangsit University retains its position after relegation in previous season, while Samut Prakan VC reaches a top division for the first time. Samut Prakan VC replaced Opart 369 (relegated after four years in the top division) and this is the comeback of Samut Prakan VC for 7 years before play in Thailand league.

Qualified teams
League positions of the previous season shown in parentheses (TH: Thailand League title holders; SL: Super League title holders).
<div style="width:850px;">

</div style="width:850px;">

Personnel and kits

Squads

National team players
Players name in bold indicates the player is registered during the mid-season transfer window.

Foreign players
Players name in bold indicates the player is registered during the mid-season transfer window.

 Withdraws

Transfers

Second leg

Schedule

Format
Regular seasons
First leg (Week 1–6): single round-robin; The  seventh place and eighth place will relegate to Pro League.
Second leg: (Week 7–13) single round-robin; The top four will advance to Final series.
Final series
First leg (Week 14): single round-robin.
Second leg: (Week 15) single round-robin.

Standing procedure 
 Number of matches won
 Match points
 Sets ratio
 Points ratio
 Result of the last match between the tied teams

Match won 3–0 or 3–1: 3 match points for the winner, 0 match points for the loser
Match won 3–2: 2 match points for the winner, 1 match point for the loser

Regular seasons – First leg

First leg table

Positions by round

Week 1
Venue: Nimitbut Sport Center, Bangkok
Dates: 12–13 December 2020

|}

Week 2
Venue: Nimitbut Sport Center, Bangkok
Dates: 19–20 December 2020

|}

Week 3
Venue: Nimitbut Sport Center, Bangkok
Dates: 26–27 December 2020

|}

Week 4 
 Sliding of the competition because Outbreak of coronavirus in Thailand
Venue: MCC Hall The Mall Ngamwongwan, Nonthaburi
Dates: 13–14 February 2021

|}

Week 5
Venue: MCC Hall The Mall Ngamwongwan, Nonthaburi
Dates: 20–21 February 2021

|}

Week 6
Venue: MCC Hall The Mall Ngamwongwan, Nonthaburi
Dates: 24,27–28 February 2021

|}

Regular seasons – Second leg

Second leg table

Positions by round

Week 7
Venue: Nimitbut Sport Center, Bangkok
Dates: 6–7 March 2021

|}

Week 8
Venue: Nimitbut Sport Center, Bangkok
Dates: 10,13–14 March 2021

|}

Week 9
Venue: Nimitbut Sport Center, Bangkok
Dates: 17,20–21 March 2021

|}

Week 10
Venue: MCC Hall The Mall Bangkapi, Bangkok
Dates: 27–28 March 2021

|}

Final series

Final series table

Week 11
Venue: MCC Hall The Mall Bangkapi, Bangkok 
Dates: 2–4 April 2021

|}

Week 12
Venue: MCC Hall The Mall Bangkapi, Bangkok
Dates: 9–11 April 2021

|}

Final standing

References
|}

Awards

Most Valuable Player
  Onuma Sittirak (Diamond food)
Best Scorer
  Chatchu-on Moksri (Nakhon Ratchasima The Mall)
Best Outside Spiker
  Chatchu-on Moksri (Nakhon Ratchasima The Mall)
  Sasipaporn Janthawisut (Diamond food)
Best Servers
  Onuma Sittirak (Diamond food)

Best Middle Blocker
  Chitaporn Kamlangmak (Nakhon Ratchasima The Mall)
  Pleumjit Thinkaow (Generali Supreme Chonburi)
Best Setter
  Sirima Manakit (Nakhon Ratchasima The Mall)
Best Opposite Spiker
  Yeliz Başa (Nakhon Ratchasima The Mall)
Best Libero 
  Yupa Sanitklang (Nakhon Ratchasima The Mall)

References

External links 

 
 

Thailand League
2020